Singilis is a genus of beetles in the family Carabidae, first described by Jules Pierre Rambur in 1837.

Species 
Singilis contains the following eighty-nine species:

 Singilis acaciae Bruneau de Mire, 1990
 Singilis africaorientalis Anichtchenko, 2016
 Singilis allardi (Basilewsky, 1963)
 Singilis alternans Bedel, 1905
 Singilis ambulans (Peringuey, 1896)
 Singilis amoenulus (Semenov, 1889)
 Singilis anthracinus Solsky, 1874
 Singilis ater (Mateu, 1978)
 Singilis bashahricus Andrewes, 1933
 Singilis basilewskyi Anichtchenko, 2012
 Singilis bedeli (Escalera, 1913)
 Singilis bedimo Anichtchenko, 2013
 Singilis bicolor Rambur, 1837
 Singilis blandus (Peringuey, 1896)
 Singilis bulirschi Anichtchenko, 2014
 Singilis burtoni Anichtchenko, 2016
 Singilis centralis Antoine, 1963
 Singilis cingulatus Gebler, 1843
 Singilis cordiger (Peringuey, 1896)
 Singilis cribricollis (Peringuey, 1904)
 Singilis crypticus Anichtchenko, 2016
 Singilis cyaneus (Peringuey, 1896)
 Singilis debilis Anichtchenko, 2013
 Singilis decellei (Basilewsky, 1963)
 Singilis discoidalis (Mateu, 1986)
 Singilis dorsalis (Peringuey, 1896)
 Singilis fasciatus (Peringuey, 1896)
 Singilis felixi Anichtchenko, 2011
 Singilis filicornis Peyerimhoff, 1907
 Singilis flavipes (Solsky, 1874)
 Singilis fuscipennis Schaum, 1857
 Singilis fuscoflavus (Felix & Muilwijk, 2009)
 Singilis gentilis (Peringuey, 1896)
 Singilis haekeli Anichtchenko, 2016
 Singilis hanangiensis (Basilewsky, 1962)
 Singilis hirtipennis (Pic, 1901)
 Singilis indicus (Andrewes, 1933)
 Singilis jedlickai Anichtchenko, 2011
 Singilis kabakovi Anichtchenko, 2011
 Singilis klimenkoi Anichtchenko, 2011
 Singilis kolesnichenkoi Anichtchenko, 2011
 Singilis kryzhanovskii Anichtchenko, 2011
 Singilis laetus (Peringuey, 1896)
 Singilis leleupi (Basilewsky, 1962)
 Singilis libani J.R.Sahlberg, 1913
 Singilis lindemannae Basilewsky, 1968
 Singilis loeffleri Jedlicka, 1963
 Singilis lucidus Anichtchenko, 2013
 Singilis maculatus (Mateu, 1978)
 Singilis mahratta Andrewes, 1933
 Singilis makarovi Anichtchenko, 2011
 Singilis mashunus (Peringuey, 1896)
 Singilis mauritanicus Lucas, 1846
 Singilis mbolom Anichtchenko, 2013
 Singilis mesopotamicus Pic, 1901
 Singilis montanus Anichtchenko, 2012
 Singilis muelleri Anichtchenko, 2012
 Singilis nepalensis (Kirschenhofer, 1994)
 Singilis ordinarius Anichtchenko, 2013
 Singilis paganeli Anichtchenko, 2016
 Singilis pallens Anichtchenko, 2016
 Singilis parvulus Anichtchenko, 2016
 Singilis persicus Jedlicka, 1961
 Singilis plagiatus (Reiche & Saulcy, 1855)
 Singilis praestans Peringuey, 1896
 Singilis praeustus Peringuey, 1896
 Singilis puchneri Anichtchenko, 2014
 Singilis pusillus (Peringuey, 1899)
 Singilis saeedi Anichtchenko, 2011
 Singilis schuelei Anichtchenko, 2013
 Singilis semirufus (Motschulsky, 1864)
 Singilis shalapkoi Anichtchenko, 2013
 Singilis shavrini Anichtchenko, 2016
 Singilis signatus Peringuey, 1896
 Singilis solskyi Anichtchenko, 2011
 Singilis somalicus Anichtchenko, 2016
 Singilis soror Rambur, 1837
 Singilis squalidus Andrewes, 1933
 Singilis stigma (Peringuey, 1896)
 Singilis timidus Anichtchenko, 2011
 Singilis timuri Anichtchenko, 2011
 Singilis transversus Boheman, 1848
 Singilis turcicus (Jedlicka, 1963)
 Singilis umbraculatus Boheman, 1848
 Singilis umtalinus Peringuey, 1904
 Singilis venator (Peringuey, 1896)
 Singilis vicarius (Peringuey, 1898)
 Singilis virgatus (Peringuey, 1896)
 Singilis zonata Chaudoir, 1878

References

Lebiinae